Vriesea racinae is a plant species in the genus Vriesea. This species is an epiphyte endemic to Brazil. known from the States of Espírito Santo and Minas Gerais.

Cultivars
 Vriesea 'Chiquita'
 Vriesea 'Glossy Girl'
 Vriesea 'Honeycomb'
 Vriesea 'Kerryana'
 Vriesea 'Pamela Leaver'
 Vriesea 'Yvonne'

References

racinae
Endemic flora of Brazil
Epiphytes
Plants described in 1941